Finland will send a delegation to compete at the 2010 Winter Paralympics, in Vancouver. It will be fielding a total of five athletes (three men and two women), in alpine skiing, biathlon and cross-country skiing.

Alpine skiing 

The following athlete will be Finland's sole representative in alpine skiing:

Biathlon 

The following two athletes will represent Finland in biathlon:

Cross-country skiing 

The following four athletes will represent Finland in cross-country skiing:

See also
Finland at the 2010 Winter Olympics
Finland at the Paralympics

References

External links
Vancouver 2010 Paralympic Games official website
International Paralympic Committee official website

Nations at the 2010 Winter Paralympics
2010
Paralympics